Capital Yorkshire is a regional radio station owned by Global as part of the Capital network. It broadcasts to South Yorkshire, West Yorkshire, the East Riding of Yorkshire and Northern Lincolnshire from studios in Leeds, West Yorkshire, England.

The licence held makes Capital Yorkshire the largest regional British radio station outside London.

Technical
Capital Yorkshire broadcasts on  FM at a power of 9.6 kW from High Hunsley, which covers the East Riding of Yorkshire and Northern Lincolnshire and on  FM at a power of 2.4 kW from Emley Moor, which covers West Yorkshire. It also has two filler transmitters, both on  FM, one from Idle at 0.5 kW which covers Bradford and the other from Tapton Hill at 0.24 kW covering Sheffield.

DAB broadcasts were formerly provided on the MXR 12A Yorkshire region multiplex from nine transmitters, with the strongest signal from Emley Moor, and other DAB signals from Belmont, Bilsdale, Acklam Wold (North Yorkshire), and Tapton Hill. With the closure of the MXR multiplex in 2015, Capital rolled down to being delivered over the five local area multiplexes around Yorkshire and the Humber, enabling continuation of essentially region-wide coverage.

A version of Galaxy Yorkshire's output was also broadcast in various other areas on DAB as Galaxy Digital, with the UK's ID to replace the Yorkshire one and the regional Yorkshire adverts replaced by UK-wide adverts. (In some cases, a cut down song would be played to fill in for all or part of the commercial break.) This service was aired in a number of areas which did not have their own Galaxy service (including London and the East Midlands), and was also broadcast on Sky and Virgin Media until 15 November 2010 when it was replaced with LBC News 1152. Galaxy was removed from the London DAB multiplex on 16 November 2010, replaced by The Arrow (the only Global station brand not transmitted in London at that time.)

History

Galaxy Yorkshire
The station launched at 1.05 pm on 14 February 1997 as Kiss 105, but became Galaxy 105 later that year after a take over by the Chrysalis Group, then in 2006 it became simply Galaxy Yorkshire. Launched as a dance music station, later years saw the playlist expanded to incorporate urban music genres.

The stations strapline was altered to "passion for music, passion for life" to reflect its new target demographic which had been changed from 15–29 to 15–34 . This was reinforced by the playing of more old school "Galaxy Anthems" – similar to Bauer rival Kiss's "Kisstory". In 2008 it was rebranded as a mainstream station along with all the other Galaxy Stations with a new 'Love Music' strapline before becoming "Yorkshire's No. 1 Hit Music Station" in July 2010.

Capital Yorkshire
The station was rebranded as Capital Yorkshire on 3 January 2011 as part of a merger of Global Radio's Galaxy and Hit Music networks to form the nine-station Capital network. On 20 June 2014, long serving Capital Breakfast presenter Simon Hirst (now Stephanie Hirst) left Global Radio after 14 years.

On 26 February 2019, Global confirmed the station's local breakfast and weekend shows would be replaced with networked programming from April 2019. The weekday Drivetime show was retained alongside news bulletins, traffic updates and advertising.

Programming
All networked programming originates from Global's London headquarters, including Capital Breakfast with Roman Kemp.

Local programming is produced and broadcast from Global's Leeds studios from 4–7 pm on weekdays, presented by Adam O'Neill and Joanne 'JoJo' Kelly.

News
Global's Newsroom broadcasts hourly local news updates from 5 am–6 pm on weekdays and 8 am–12 pm at weekends with headlines on the half-hour during Capital Breakfast on weekdays.

The Leeds newsroom also produces bulletins for Communicorp-owned Heart Yorkshire along with other broadcast centres.

Former notable presenters

 Bam Bam
 Sacha Brooks
 Rich Clarke
 David Dunne (Hed Kandi & Nu Cool)
 Andi Durrant
 Riley & Durrant
 Boy George
 Stephanie Hirst
 Dave Kelly

 Nemone
 Adil Ray
 Adele Roberts
 Graeme Smith
 Steve Sutherland
 Margherita Taylor
 Tiësto
 Jez Willis

References

External links
 
 History of local radio in Yorkshire.
 Emley Moor transmitter.
 High Hunsley transmitter.

Yorkshire
Radio stations established in 1997
Radio stations in Yorkshire
1997 establishments in England